Phoberopsis is a monotypic moth genus in the family Lasiocampidae first described by Yves de Lajonquière in 1972. Its only species, Phoberopsis ferox, described by George Hamilton Kenrick in 1914, is native to Madagascar.

The male has a wingspan of 70 mm. Its head, antennae, palpi and the front of its thorax are fiery orange. The legs and thorax are black. The abdomen is black ringed with pale orange. The wings are dull black without markings.

References

External links
 - with an image

Lasiocampidae
Moths of Madagascar
Monotypic moth genera